The Western New York and Pennsylvania Railway was a railroad in the U.S. states of New York and Pennsylvania.

History

Incorporated in 1887 as the Western New York and Pennsylvania Railroad from the reorganization of the Buffalo, New York, and Philadelphia, and reorganized in 1895 as the Western New York and Pennsylvania Railway, it was acquired and leased by the Pennsylvania Railroad in 1900  and merged into the Penndel Company in 1955.

The route the line followed from Emporium, Pennsylvania across the state line to Olean, Hinsdale, Cuba, Belfast, and Rochester was laid, from Belfast north, on the bed of the abandoned Genesee Valley Canal. A house of Italianate design was purchased on Main Street West at Trowbridge Street and converted into the Rochester station.

The 1895 to 1899 period saw revenue inadequate to pay the bond interest, and this was contemporaneous with the Pennsylvania's need to expand into western New York. Moreover, this expansion did not raise competitive issues with the Pennsy's principal rival, the New York Central. Thus, on 1 August 1900, the WNY&PRY signed an agreement with the PRR under which the latter operated the former. Although the WNY&PRY did not generate much profit in this arrangement, it did improve matters for the Allegheny Valley and the Philadelphia and Erie roads, so the net result was satisfactory to the Pennsylvania.

Eventually, the Western New York and Pennsylvania Railway became the Pennsylvania Railroad's Buffalo and Allegheny Valley Division.

In a minor historical anomaly, note might be taken of the date of the small branch from Scottsville to Garbutt. While the route map clearly shows this line in 1900, other sources equally unambiguously date it to the summer of 1907. The branch was abandoned in 1944; no trace of it remains today. The Pennsy station has disappeared – even photographs of it are exceedingly rare – and the railbed cannot be discerned in aerial photographs of the area south of Oatka Creek.)

See also
New Castle Branch
A short-line railway began operations in 2001 under the name Western New York and Pennsylvania Railroad, running trains on former Erie Railroad and later former WNY&P trackage.

References

External links
Western New York And Pennsylvania Railway (1895–1955) at Youtube.com

Defunct New York (state) railroads
Defunct Pennsylvania railroads
Predecessors of the Pennsylvania Railroad
Railway companies established in 1895
Railway companies disestablished in 1955
American companies disestablished in 1955
American companies established in 1895